William S. Schwefel was a member of the Wisconsin State Assembly.

Biography
Schwefel was born on October 5, 1902, in LeRoy, Wisconsin. He attended high school in Brownsville, Wisconsin before attending the University of Wisconsin-Madison. Schwefel died on August 16, 1985.

Career
Schwefel was first elected to the Assembly in 1964. He was a Republican.

References

People from LeRoy, Wisconsin
Republican Party members of the Wisconsin State Assembly
University of Wisconsin–Madison alumni
1902 births
1985 deaths
20th-century American politicians